The Minister for Local Government is a cabinet position in the Welsh Government which has existed in various forms since the creation of the Welsh Government. The office is currently held by the Minister for Finance Rebecca Evans MS.

In the past, the position had responsibility for housing in Wales. From 2018 to 2021, the position was titled as Minister for Housing and Local Government under the term of Julie James MS.

The minister was responsible for local authorities' housing activities, homelessness, regulation of the private rented sector, regulation of commercial tenancies let by local authorities, Local Government relations and structures, the audit and inspection of public services, planning regulation, and a range of other issues. Responsibilities involved with Local Government was merged with Finance responsibilities, and responsibilities on housing was transferred to a new super department (climate change) under Julie James.

Ministers
The below shows all ministerial positions to cover the briefs of Housing and/or Local Government, as the role has not always been held by one Minister alone.

See also 

 Housing in Wales
 Local government in Wales
 Welsh Local Government Association

References

External links 

 Housing at the Welsh Government website
 The Welsh Local Government Association website

Welsh Government
Housing in Wales
Housing ministries
Local government ministries